Sin (Swedish: Synd) is a 1948 Swedish drama film directed by Arnold Sjöstrand and starring Birgit Tengroth, Sture Lagerwall and Gunnar Sjöberg. It was shot at the Centrumateljéerna Studios in Stockholm. The film's sets were designed by the art director Nils Nordemar. It is unrelated to the 1928 silent film of the same title directed by Gustaf Molander.

Synopsis
Fredrik Hermansson seduces Anna and swindles her out of her savings in order to pursue his ambitions. He even goes so far as forging the signature of her wealthy aunt.

Cast
 Birgit Tengroth as 	Anna
 Sture Lagerwall as 	Fredrik Hermansson
 Gunnar Sjöberg as Martin Alm
 Stig Järrel as 	Brust
 Hilda Borgström as 	Mrs. Alm
 Anne-Margrethe Björlin as 	Edith Björk
 Anna-Stina Wåglund as 	Stina
 Gustav Hedberg as 	A Man 
 Georg Skarstedt as 	Hotel porter
 Torsten Bergström as 	Priest
 Aurore Palmgren as 	Hilda, Anna's aunt
 Stig Johanson as 	Fredrik's friend
 Gunnel Wadner as Fredrik's business colleague
 Olle Hilding as 	Banker
 Bertil Ehrenmark as 	Fredrik's business colleague

References

Bibliography 
 Qvist, Per Olov & von Bagh, Peter. Guide to the Cinema of Sweden and Finland. Greenwood Publishing Group, 2000.

External links 
 

1948 films
Swedish drama films
1948 drama films
1940s Swedish-language films
Films directed by Arnold Sjöstrand
Swedish black-and-white films
1940s Swedish films